"You Know What To Do" is a song by American singer-songwriter Carly Simon. Written by Simon, Jacob Brackman, Peter Wood, and Mike Mainieri, the song was produced by Mainieri and served as the lead single from Simon's 11th studio album, Hello Big Man (1983).

Track listing
7" single 
 "You Know What to Do" – 4:16
 "Orpheus" – 3:50

Personnel

Charts

Music video
Simon released a music video for the single. It was directed by Dominic Orlando as per a concept of Simon's, and was filmed on location in Martha's Vineyard, at her home and in the surrounding woods in August 1983. The video received moderate airplay on MTV in the autumn of 1983.

References

External links
Carly Simon's Official Website

1983 singles
1983 songs
Carly Simon songs
Songs written by Carly Simon
Songs written by Jacob Brackman
Warner Records singles